Paikgacha is an upazila of the Khulna District in the division of Khulna, Bangladesh.

Geography
It has 41,194 households and a total area of 411.19 km2.

Demographics
As of the 1991 Bangladesh census, Paikgachha has a population of 225,085. 51.14% of the population is male, and 48.86% female. 117,629 of its citizens are aged eighteen or older. Paikgachha has an average literacy rate of 32.6% for those aged 7 years or older compared with the national average of 32.4%.

Administration
Paikgacha Upazila is divided into Paikgacha Municipality and ten union parishads: Chandkhali, Deluti, Godaipur, Goroikhali, Horidhali, Kopilmuni, Loskor, Lota, Raruli, and Soladana. The union parishads are subdivided into 149 mauzas and 212 villages.

Paikgacha Municipality is subdivided into 9 wards and 5 mahallas.

Transport
Paikgachha Bridge connects Paikgachha with Koyra Upazila successfully. The main route of transport to Paikgachha from other parts of the country is by bus.

Education

Secondary school
 Lakshmikhola High School
 Sreekanthopur K.R Junior High School
 Shaheed Kamrul Memorial High school Baka Bazar
 Paikgachha Govt. Boys School
 Haridhali Union High School
 Kharia High School, Kharia, Paikgacha
 Bholanath Sukhada Sundari Secondary School
 Shaheed Zia Girls High School
 Kharia Nabarun Secondary School, Kharia, Paikgacha
 Paikgachha  Govt. Girls School
 Chandkhali Multilateral Secondary School
 K.D.S High School, Paikgacha, Khulna
 PTD Technical and Vocational School
 Kapilmuni Sahachari Vidya Mandir
 Mathbati G.G.P.G Dakhil Madrasah, Paikgachha, Khulna
 K.G.H.F Mowkhali United Academy, Mowkhali, Paikgacha, Khulna
 Soladana Secondary School, Soladana, Paikgacha
 Amurkata Rondhanu Madhyamic Bidyaioy, Soladana, Paikgacha
 Charbandha High School, Charbandha, Soladana, Pikgacha
 Katipara High School
 R.K.B.K. Horischandra Collegiate Institution (Raruli, Katipara, Baka, Kharsha)
 Raruli Bhubon Mohini Girls School
 Wazed Ali High School
 Shaheed Kamrul Memorial High School (Baka, Raruli, Paikgacha)

College
 Lakshmikhola Collegiate School
 Sreekanthopur K.R College
 Paikgachha Govt.College
 Habibnagor M K D S B Fazil Madrasah
 Chandkhali College
 K.D.S High School, Paikgacha, Khulna
 Fasiar Rahman Mohila Degree College, Paikgachha
 Alomtala Sinior Fazil Madrasah
 Gojalia Kalua Alim Madrasah
 Kapilmuni Sahachary Vidya Mandir School and  College
 Kapilmuni College
 Haridhali Kapilmuni Mohila College
 Sardar Abu Hossen College, Soladana
 Shahid Ayub and Musa Memorial College, Garaikhali
 Kalinagar College, Kalinagar, Deluti.
 R.K.B.K. Horischandra Collegiate Institution (Raruli, Katipara, Baka, Kharsha)

Notable residents
 Sheikh Razzak Ali, the Member of Parliament for constituency Khulna-10 from 1979 to 1986 and for Khulna-2 from 1991 until 2001,  was born in Paikgachha in 1928.
 Qazi Imdadul Haq, writer, was born in Gadaipur in 1882.
 Prafulla Chandra Ray, chemist, educator and entrepreneur, was born in Raruli-Katipara village in 1861.

References

 Upazilas of Khulna District
 Khulna Division